We Get Requests is an album by jazz pianist Oscar Peterson and his trio, released in 1964. It was recorded at RCA Studios New York City over October 19 (tracks 1, 5, 7), October 20 (tracks 2, 3, 4, 6, 8, 9) and November 19 or 20 (track 10). This album is Peterson's last of his fourteen-year work with Verve.



Track listing
"Quiet Nights Of Quiet Stars (Corcovado)" (Antonio Carlos Jobim) – 2:49
"The Days of Wine and Roses" (Henry Mancini, Johnny Mercer) – 2:40
"My One and Only Love" (Robert Mellin, Guy Wood) – 5:08
"People" (Bob Merrill, Jule Styne) – 3:30
"Have You Met Miss Jones?" (Lorenz Hart, Richard Rodgers) – 4:10
"You Look Good to Me" (Seymour Lefco, Clement Wells) – 4:49
"The Girl from Ipanema" (Jobim, Vinicius de Moraes, Norman Gimbel) – 3:51
"D & E" (John Lewis) – 5:11
"Time and Again" (aka Don't You Think?) (Stuff Smith) – 4:38
"Goodbye J.D." (Oscar Peterson) – 2:56

Personnel
The Oscar Peterson Trio
Oscar Peterson - piano
Ray Brown - double bass
Ed Thigpen - drums
Production (from original album)
 Jim Davis - Producer
 Val Valentin - Director of Engineering
 Bob Simpson - Recording Engineer

Charts

References

1964 albums
Oscar Peterson albums
Verve Records albums
Albums produced by Norman Granz